Ellington High School is a public high school located in Ellington, Connecticut. The school teams are known as the Knights.  Their colors are purple and gold. Ellington is a part of Ellington Public Schools.

References

External links
 

Ellington, Connecticut
Schools in Tolland County, Connecticut
Public high schools in Connecticut